Philip Villamin Vera Cruz (December 25, 1904 – June 12, 1994) was a Filipino American labor leader, farmworker, and leader in the Asian American movement. He helped found the Agricultural Workers Organizing Committee (AWOC), which later merged with the National Farm Workers Association (NFWA) to become the United Farm Workers (UFW). As the union's long-time second vice president, he worked to improve the working conditions of migrant workers.

Early life
Vera Cruz was born in  Saoang, San Juan, Ilocos Sur, Philippines (then a territory of the United States) on December 25, 1904. As a small boy, he tended to water buffalo (carabaos) for his father, which he described as much easier than the work he would do in California. In 1926, Vera Cruz moved to the United States, where he performed a wide variety of jobs, including working in an Alaskan cannery, a restaurant, and a box factory. He was briefly a member of the Industrial Workers of the World. For a year, beginning in 1931, Vera Cruz studied at Gonzaga University. In 1942, he was drafted into the United States Army, but was later discharged due to age.

Labor activities
Vera Cruz eventually settled in California, where he became a farmworker. He joined the AFL-CIO-affiliated union, the National Farm Labor Union, in the 1950s. His union local, based in Delano, California, had an Agricultural Workers Organizing Committee (AWOC). The prime focus of AWOC was to add members to the National Farm Labor Union. AWOC was composed primarily of Filipino American farmworker organizers, although it did hire Dolores Huerta. Huerta eventually quit the AWOC to join the National Farm Workers of America, which had a primarily Mexican American membership.

Philip Vera Cruz, a former UFW Vice President, described the start of the great Delano grape strike. 

On September 8, 1965, the Delano local voted to strike against the grape growers. Following the strike call, the growers attempted to bring in Mexican American workers, some of whom were affiliated with the National Farm Workers of America. Cesar Chavez, Dolores Huerta, and other leaders of the National Farm Workers of America met with several National Farm Labor Union organizers, including Vera Cruz, Larry Itliong, Benjamin Gines and Pete Velasco. Together, they decided that both unions would strike against the grape growers, an action which eventually led to both unions joining to become the United Farm Workers. The new union debuted in August 1966, and continued the strike into 1970.

In the new union, Vera Cruz served as second vice president and on the managing board.

Leaving the UFW and later life
Vera Cruz resigned from the UFW in 1977. Vera Cruz and Chavez had been drifting apart, and Vera Cruz felt that Chavez did not give Filipinos due credit for their role in starting the labor movement. Things culminated that year, when Chavez traveled to the Philippines to meet with Ferdinand Marcos, whom Vera Cruz saw as a brutal dictator. Vera Cruz continued to live in the San Joaquin Valley of California after his resignation, and remained active in union and social justice issues for the rest of his life. Vera Cruz received the Ninoy M. Aquino Award in 1987, traveling to the Philippines for the first time in fifty years to accept it. In 1992, the AFL-CIO's Asia Pacific American Labor Committee honored Vera Cruz at its founding convention. He died at the age of 89 in 1994, in Bakersfield, California.

Legacy
In 2013, the New Haven Unified School District renamed Alvarado Middle School as Itliong-Vera Cruz Middle School in honor of Vera Cruz and Larry Itliong; this school is the first school in the United States to be named after Filipino Americans.

See also 

 Dolores Huerta
 Larry Itliong
 Cesar Chavez

References

Further reading 

 Vera Cruz, P., Valledor, S. A. (2006). The Original Writings of Philip Vera Cruz. United States: Dog Ear Pub..
 Scharlin, C., Villanueva, L. (2011). Philip Vera Cruz: A Personal History of Filipino Immigrants and the Farmworkers Movement. United Kingdom: University of Washington Press.

American trade union leaders
United States Army personnel of World War II
Filipino emigrants to the United States
Gonzaga University alumni
Industrial Workers of the World members
People from Ilocos Sur
United Farm Workers people
1904 births
1994 deaths
People from Delano, California
Trade unionists from California
American trade unionists of Filipino descent